Wrangell Public Schools is a school district headquartered in Wrangell, Alaska.

Schools:
 Evergreen Elementary School
 Stikine Middle School
 Wrangell High School

References

External links
 Wrangell Public Schools

School districts in Alaska
Education in Wrangell, Alaska